Senator Cyr may refer to:

Edward P. Cyr (1914–1992), Maine State Senate
Julian Cyr (born 1986), Massachusetts State Senate